Jørgen Gunnerud (born 2 June 1948) is a Norwegian crime fiction writer.

He made his literary debut in 1994, with the novel Raymond Isaksens utgang. Further novels are Kvinnen fra Olaf Ryes plass from 1996 and Gjerningsmann: ukjent from 1998. He was awarded the Riverton Prize in 2007, for the novel Høstjakt. The "hero" in Gunnerud's novels is police officer "Knut Moen".

In the 1960s, Gunnerud joined the political movement associated with AKP (m-l).

References

1948 births
Living people
Writers from Oslo
Norwegian male novelists
Norwegian crime fiction writers
20th-century Norwegian novelists
21st-century Norwegian novelists
20th-century Norwegian male writers
21st-century Norwegian male writers